Lana Harrison (born 1992 in Auckland) is a New Zealand professional squash player. She won the 2022 Auckland Open.

References

1992 births
Living people
New Zealand female squash players